Franz Ernst (born 30 July 1938) is a Danish film director and screenwriter. He has directed eleven films since 1965. His 1970 film Ang.: Lone was entered into the 21st Berlin International Film Festival where it won a Special Recognition award.

Selected filmography
 Ang.: Lone (1970)
 The Double Man (1976)

References

External links

1938 births
Living people
Danish film directors
Danish male screenwriters